The Hotel Patrie in Roberts, Idaho was built in 1892 and expanded in 1915 and in the 1920s.  It has also been known as the Adams Hotel, as the Roberts Hotel, and as the American Hotel.  It was listed on the National Register of Historic Places in 1978.

It is a two-story U-shaped brick building that, after expansions, is eight bays wide.

It was deemed significant as one of the oldest and largest buildings surviving in Roberts after the 1976 Teton dam flood.

See also

 List of National Historic Landmarks in Idaho
 National Register of Historic Places listings in Jefferson County, Idaho

References

Buildings and structures in Jefferson County, Idaho
Hotel buildings on the National Register of Historic Places in Idaho
National Register of Historic Places in Jefferson County, Idaho